Wu Dan or Wudan may refer to:

Wu Dan (Chinese opera) (武旦), a type of female role in Chinese opera specialized in fighting with all kinds of weapons
Wudan, Inner Mongolia (乌丹), a town in Ongniud Banner, Inner Mongolia, China

People
Emperor Ruizong of Tang (662–716), used the personal name Wu Dan (武旦) from 698 to 705
Wu Dan (volleyball) (巫丹) (born 1968), Chinese volleyball player

See also
 Wudang (disambiguation)
 Wu-Tang (disambiguation)